Houghtaling is a surname. Notable people with the surname include:

Eric Houghtaling (born 1954), American politician
John Joseph Houghtaling (1916–2009)
John W. Houghtaling II (born 1971)

See also
Teunis Houghtaling House
Abraham Houghtaling House
Peter Houghtaling Farm and Lime Kiln
Jennifer Mudd Houghtaling Postpartum Depression Foundation